In the United States, the government of each of the 50 states is structured in accordance with its individual constitution. In turn, each state constitution must be grounded in republican principles. Article IV, Section 4, Clause 1 of the United States Constitution tasks the federal government with assuring that each state's government is so organized.

All state governments are modeled after the federal government and consist of three branches (although the three-branch structure is not Constitutionally required): executive, legislative, and judicial. All state governments are also organized as presidential systems where the governor is both head of government and head of state (even though this too is not required). The government of each of the five permanently inhabited U.S. territories is modeled and organized in a like fashion.

Each state is itself a sovereign entity, and as such, reserves the right to organize in any way (within the above stated parameter) deemed appropriate by its people. As a result, while the governments of the various states share many similar features, they often vary greatly with regard to form and substance. No two state governments are identical. The following tables compare and contrast some of the features of U.S. state governments.

Legislative

With the exception of Nebraska, all American state legislatures are bicameral, meaning there is one legislative body separated into two units. Nebraska eliminated its lower house with a referendum during the 1936 elections. Also, some systems, such as New York's, have two legislative bodies while never technically referring to them in the state constitution as a single body. These dual systems are generally considered bicameral.

Supermajority requirements 
While only 13 states have a filibuster, there are often restrictions on the majority a state needs to raise taxes.

Executive

The Governor is the chief executive official in each state.

Note: Table does not distinguish between consecutive term limits and total term limits, unless otherwise noted.

Judicial

Note: Table does not distinguish between term lengths that result in a new election and term lengths that result in a retention vote but not a full election.

See also 
 List of U.S. state constitutions
 Initiatives and referendums in the United States — compares states on what they allow
 Government of the District of Columbia
 Government of Puerto Rico
 Territories of the United States

Notes

References

Sources
 National Conference of State Legislatures Term Limit Chart
 Term Limits.Org, Term limit data for AZ AR CA CO FL LA MA MI MO MT NB NV OH OK SD WY , Accessed on June 27, 2009.

State government in the United States